The 2018 Shenzhen Longhua Open was a professional tennis tournament played on hard courts. It was the second (men) and third (women) editions of the tournament which was part of the 2018 ATP Challenger Tour and the 2018 ITF Women's Circuit. It took place in Shenzhen, China between 29 October and 11 November 2018.

Men's singles main-draw entrants

Seeds

 1 Rankings are as of 22 October 2018.

Other entrants
The following players received wildcards into the singles main draw:
  Mu Tao
  Te Rigele
  Wu Yibing
  Xia Zihao

The following players received entry from the qualifying draw:
  Sasikumar Mukund
  Saketh Myneni
  Sumit Nagal
  Gonçalo Oliveira

Women's singles main-draw entrants

Seeds

 1 Rankings are as of 29 October 2018.

Other entrants
The following players received wildcards into the singles main draw:
  Ma Shuyue
  Wang Meiling
  Wang Xinyu
  Yang Zhaoxuan

The following player received entry by a special exempt:
  Han Na-lae

The following players received entry from the qualifying draw:
  Olga Doroshina
  Jang Su-jeong
  Lu Jingjing
  Junri Namigata

The following players received entry as lucky losers:
  Kim Da-bin
  Peangtarn Plipuech
  Yuan Yue

Champions

Men's singles

 Miomir Kecmanović def.  Blaž Kavčič 6–2, 2–6, 6–3.

Women's singles

 Ivana Jorović def.  Zheng Saisai, 6–3, 2–6, 6–4

Men's doubles

 Hsieh Cheng-peng /  Christopher Rungkat def.  Sriram Balaji /  Jeevan Nedunchezhiyan 6–4, 6–2.

Women's doubles

 Shuko Aoyama /  Yang Zhaoxuan def.  Choi Ji-hee /  Luksika Kumkhum, 6–2, 6–3

External links 
 2018 Shenzhen Longhua Open at ITFtennis.com

2018 ATP Challenger Tour
2018 ITF Women's Circuit
2018 in Chinese tennis
Shenzhen Longhua Open